Steven Bauer (born Esteban Ernesto Echevarría Samson; December 2, 1956) is a Cuban-born American actor.

Bauer began his career on PBS, portraying Joe Peña, the son of Cuban immigrants on ¿Qué Pasa, USA? (1977–1979) and is perhaps most famous for his role as the Cuban drug lord Manolo "Manny" Ribera in the 1983 crime drama Scarface, in which he starred alongside Al Pacino and Michelle Pfeiffer. He also played the drug cartel leader Eladio Vuente in Breaking Bad (2011) and in Better Call Saul (2017-2022) and the retired Mossad agent Avi Rudin in Ray Donovan (2013–2017).

Early life and education
Bauer was born Esteban Ernesto Echevarría Samson, on December 2, 1956, in Havana, Cuba, the son of Lillian Samson Agostini, a schoolteacher, and Esteban Echevarría, a commercial pilot who worked for Cubana Airlines. Bauer's maternal grandfather, whose family names were Samson and Bauer, was Jewish, and immigrated to Cuba from Germany, a refugee looking to escape the devastating effects World War II and Adolf Hitler had on his safety and home country.

Bauer's family emigrated from Cuba to the United States on Independence Day, 1960, when he was three years old, shortly after the end of the Cuban Revolution, settling in Miami, Florida. Once in the United States, he began using the name Steven, an English form of his given name, Esteban. He graduated from Miami Coral Park High School in 1974 and went on to study acting at Miami Dade Community College and then at the University of Miami, where  he befriended Ray Liotta.

Acting career
Bauer's first substantial role was in the PBS bilingual sitcom ¿Qué Pasa, USA?, playing the teenage son of a Cuban exile family in Miami, from 1977 to 1979. He also appeared in the 1980 TV miniseries From Here to Eternity. He was credited in these and a few other early projects as Rocky Echevarría. In 1981, Bauer starred in the television movie She's in the Army Now, where he met his first wife, actress Melanie Griffith. They both moved to New York City and stayed at Ray Liotta's apartment, while Liotta moved to Los Angeles and stayed at theirs. Both Bauer and Griffith studied under acting teacher Stella Adler, and he appeared in several off-Broadway productions. During this time he adopted the stage name "Steven Bauer".

Bauer was given the role of Manny Ribera (the part played by George Raft in the original 1932 version) in the 1983 movie Scarface, even though (like Raft) he was a relatively unknown actor at the time. The producers of Scarface were convinced that he was right for the role based on his strong audition, as well as his authentic Cuban background. His performance drew a Golden Globe nomination for Best Supporting Actor. In 1986 he had two other important roles. The first was as Det. Frank Sigliano in the Billy Crystal and Gregory Hines cop comedy Running Scared. The second was as an Israeli soldier named Avner in the Canadian CTV television movie Sword of Gideon, which tells the story of Mossad agents hunting down terrorists in the aftermath of the 1972 Munich massacre. The Sword of Gideon script was the basis for Steven Spielberg's later film Munich, which follows the same storyline and borrows heavily from the Sword of Gideon story and script. In 1990 Bauer played the role of DEA agent Enrique "Kiki" Camarena in the television miniseries Drug Wars: The Camarena Story alongside Benicio Del Toro and Craig T. Nelson. That same year, Bauer took over the series lead of the television show Wiseguy from Ken Wahl for the fourth and final season, playing U.S. Attorney Michael Santana after Wahl's character disappears.

Since then, Bauer has made his career primarily, though not exclusively, in action films and crime dramas on both the big and small screens. An example of this is the movie The Lost City where he served in a minor role alongside the film's star and director Andy Garcia. Also, including such motion pictures as Primal Fear and Traffic. In 2007 he appeared on an episode of Burn Notice. In 2011, Bauer appeared on the series Breaking Bad playing Mexican drug lord Don Eladio. He stars with Julianne Michelle in the feature film Awakened, a supernatural thriller.

More recently, Bauer appeared as ex-Mossad agent turned private investigator Avi in the Showtime series Ray Donovan. Bauer also reprised his Breaking Bad role in 2017 in AMC's prequel Better Call Saul. In addition, he played El Santo in the American version of Queen of the South.

Personal life
Bauer has married four times: first to Melanie Griffith, from 1981 until 1989; second to Ingrid Anderson, from 1989 until 1991; third to Christiana Boney, from 1992 until 2002; and fourth to Paulette Miltimore, from 2003 until 2012.  He has two sons: Alexander Griffith Bauer (born August 22, 1985) with Griffith and Dylan Dean Steven Bauer (born May 14, 1990) with Anderson.

Filmography

Film

Television

Video games

Music videos

Awards and nominations 
 Nominated – Golden Globe Award – Best Performance by an Actor in a Supporting Role in a Motion Picture – Scarface (1984)
 Nominated – Golden Globe Award – Best Performance by an Actor in a Mini-series or Motion Picture Made for TV – Drug Wars: The Camarena Story (1990)
 Won – Screen Actors Guild Award – Outstanding Performance by a Cast in a Motion Picture – Traffic (2000)
 Won – Short Film Award – Best Supporting Actor – Crumble (2010)
 Won – Festival Award – Best Actor – The Last Gamble (2011)
 Won – Feature Film Award – Best Actor – The Last Gamble (2012)
 Nominated – Saturn Award – Best Guest Starring Role on Television – Breaking Bad

See also
List of Cubans

References

External links

Steven Bauer's official MySpace profile

1956 births
Jewish American male actors
American male film actors
American male television actors
Cuban male television actors
Cuban emigrants to the United States
Cuban people of German-Jewish descent
Living people
Miami Dade College alumni
Outstanding Performance by a Cast in a Motion Picture Screen Actors Guild Award winners
Male actors from Miami
University of Miami alumni
Cuban male film actors
20th-century American male actors
20th-century Cuban male actors
American people of German-Jewish descent
21st-century American male actors
21st-century Cuban male actors
American male video game actors
American male voice actors
Cuban male voice actors
Griffith family
21st-century American Jews